Denmark – Moldova relations refers to the current and historical relations between Denmark and Moldova. Neither country has a resident ambassador. The Moldovan Ambassador to Denmark is Igor Corman, who resides in  Berlin  and was appointed in 2005. The Danish Ambassador in Moldova is Ole Harald Lisborg, who resides in Bucharest.

History
The Republic of Moldova and the Kingdom of Denmark established diplomatic relations on January 20, 1992. The Kingdom of Denmark recognized the independence of Moldova on December 31, 1991. On 22 April 2009, a Danish House opened in Chisinau. the house is as per 2017 not existing anymore.

State visits
Moldovan Minister of Foreign Affairs visited Denmark in June 1996, and Moldovan Foreign Minister paid a visit to Denmark in December 1997. Danish politician Ruben Madsen visited Transnistria in November 2010.

Trade
In 2008, Danish export to Moldova amounted 80 million DKK, and imports were under 1 million DKK.

Political, technical and humanitarian assistance
The Ministry of Foreign Affairs of Denmark provides support for a Programme Against Human Trafficking in Moldava that also operates in Ukraine and Belarus. In Moldova, the program is implemented by the International Organisation for Migration and the La Strada International Association.

The Danish government provided financial contributions to the Organization for Security and Co-operation in Europe fund which monitoring the withdrawal of Russian weapons and ammunition from Moldova's Dniester region.

The technical assistance offered by Denmark to the Republic of Moldova includes especially projects in the sphere of environment (district of Edinet, Cahul, Tighina). Denmark together with Sweden and the UN  also provide financial assistance to the Moldovan parliament whose building and infrastructure were seriously damaged and largely ruined during the April 2009 post-election pogrom.

Agreements 
In 2004, The Moldovan parliament voted for the ratification of a Moldovan-Danish memorandum on implementation of the Kyoto Protocol under which Denmark committed itself to financing a series of projects aimed at reducing greenhouse gas emissions in Moldova.

See also
 Foreign relations of Denmark
 Foreign relations of Moldova
 Moldovans in Denmark
 Danes in Moldova
 Moldova–European Union relations 
 Accession of Moldova to the European Union

References

External links

 
Moldova 
Bilateral relations of Moldova